Jonathan Erlich and Harel Levy were the defending champions, but they decided not to participate.
Rameez Junaid and Frank Moser defeated Jamie Delgado and Jonathan Marray 6–2, 6–4 in the final.

Seeds

Draw

Draw

References
 Doubles Draw

Doubles